Syria participated in the 1997 West Asian Games held in Tehran, Iran from November 19 to November 28, 1997. Syria ranked 3rd with 16 gold medals in this edition of the West Asian Games.

Medal table

References

External links
Official website

West Asian Games
Nations at the 1997 West Asian Games
Syria at the West Asian Games